Klimowicz is a Polish-language surname. The same form is used by men and women. Klimowicz is related to a number of surnames in other languages:

People
Cyryl Klimowicz (born 1952), Ordinary of the Roman Catholic Diocese of Saint Joseph in Irkutsk, Russia
Diego Klimowicz (born 1974), Argentine soccer player
Hillary Klimowicz (born 1987), American basketball player
Javier Klimowicz (born 1977), Argentinian-born Ecuadorian soccer player
Mateo Klimowicz (born 2000), Argentinian soccer player
Mieczysław Klimowicz (1919–2008), Polish historian

See also
 

Polish-language surnames
es:Klimowicz
fr:Klimowicz
pl:Klimowicz